Charles Gary (June 1, 1920 – June 4, 2011) was an American Negro league third baseman for the Homestead Grays from 1948 to 1950.

A native of Selma, Alabama, Gary served in the United States Navy prior to playing in the Negro leagues. He joined the Homestead Grays during their 1948 Negro World Series championship season, and played with the team through 1950. Gary died in Daytona Beach, Florida in 2011 at age 91.

References

External links
 and Seamheads
 Charles Gary biography from Society for American Baseball Research (SABR)

1920 births
2011 deaths
Homestead Grays players
Baseball third basemen
Baseball players from Alabama
Sportspeople from Selma, Alabama
United States Navy personnel of World War II
20th-century African-American sportspeople
21st-century African-American people